Numancia may refer to:

Places
Numancia, Spanish spelling of the ancient Celtiberian city of Numantia, near modern Soria, Spain
Numancia de la Sagra, a town in Toledo, Spain
Numancia (Madrid), a ward of Madrid, Spain
Numancia, Aklan, a town in the Philippines

Ships
Spanish ironclad Numancia, the first ironclad warship to circumnavigate the Earth
, modern Spanish frigate

Other
CD Numancia, a professional football club in Spain

See also
Siege of Numantia (134–33 BC), Roman siege of the Celtiberian city
The Siege of Numantia (c.1582), play by Cervantes about the siege